Simonsberg is part of the Cape Fold Belt in the Western Cape province of South Africa. It is located between the towns of Stellenbosch, Paarl and Franschhoek, forming a prominent 1399 m high mountain, as it is detached from the other ranges in the winelands region. Simonsberg is named after Simon van der Stel, first governor of the Cape and founder and namesake of Stellenbosch and Simon's Town. The mountain has 7 caves as part of a mining project for silver.

External links

The Rootstock Blogspot: Simonsberg: Mountain of Women

Mountains of the Western Cape